Keith Pyott (Blackheath, London, 9 March 1902 - 6 April 1968) was a British actor.

He transferred from stage to screen and was a regular face in drama in the early days of television, appearing in Educated Evans, The Prisoner, Out of the Unknown, The Avengers and the Doctor Who story The Aztecs.

He also appeared in over twenty feature films, including Orson Welles' Chimes at Midnight (1965).

Pyott was married to the actress Sheila Raynor.

Selected filmography
 Call of the Blood (1948) - Dr. Sabatier
 The Spider and the Fly (1949) - Father Pletsier
 Distant Trumpet (1952) - Sir Rudolph Gettins
 Time Bomb (1953) - Train District Supt. (uncredited)
 Sea Devils (1953) - General Latour
 The House of the Arrow (1953) - Gaston, the butler
 A Day to Remember (1953) - Frenchman with Watches (uncredited)
 John Wesley (1954) - Rev. Samuel Weslwy
 Twist of Fate (1954) - Georges
 The Colditz Story (1955) - French Colonel
 Miracle in Soho (1957) - House Surgeon (uncredited)
 I Accuse! (1958) - Judge - 2nd Dreyfus trial
 The Salvage Gang (1958) - Man in Telephone Box
 Operation Amsterdam (1959) - Diamond Merchant
 Bluebeard's Ten Honeymoons (1960) - Estate Agent
 Village of the Damned (1960) - Dr. Carlisle
 A Weekend with Lulu (1961) - Count's Butler
 The Pirates of Blood River (1962) - Silas (uncredited)
 The Phantom of the Opera (1962) - Weaver
 Five Have a Mystery to Solve (1964) - Sir Hugo Blaize
 Masquerade (1965) - Gustave
 Chimes at Midnight (1965)
 The Devil Rides Out (1968) - Max (uncredited)

References

External links

1902 births
1968 deaths
People from Blackheath, London
English male stage actors
English male film actors
English male television actors
Male actors from Kent
20th-century English male actors